Little Crosby is a village to the north of Great Crosby in Sefton, Merseyside, England.  It contains 29 buildings that are recorded in the National Heritage List for England as designated listed buildings.   Of these, one is listed at Grade II*, the middle of the three grades, and the others are at Grade II, the lowest grade.  The most important building in the village is Crosby Hall.

The hall and its outbuildings, some of which have been converted for use by the Crosby Hall Educational Trust, and other structures associated with the hall, are included in the list.  Most of the other listed buildings are houses in the main street of the village, together with a church, a presbytery and convent, and a medieval cross.

Key

Buildings

See also
 Grade I listed buildings in Merseyside
 Grade II* listed buildings in Merseyside

References

Citations

Sources

Listed buildings in Merseyside
Lists of listed buildings in Merseyside